Brain Candy is the third studio album from Australian duo Hockey Dad. The album was released on 31 July 2020 by Farmer & The Owl and debuted at number 2 on the ARIA Albums Chart.

The album was nominated for Best Album at the 2021 Rolling Stone Australia Awards.

Reception

Mark Deming form AllMusic said "[Hockey Dad] have gained a bit in the way of chops over the space of four years, and they certainly know their way around the studio better; the guitar, bass, and keyboard overdubs give the album a fuller and more satisfying sound without squeezing the spontaneity out of the tracks, and the melodies possess a bit more complexity, adding additional layers that make the results sound a touch more grown up than before." Deming concluded saying "Brain Candy isn't kid's stuff, but rather the word of two guys determined to make adulthood work for them without spoiling everything, and Hockey Dad hit that target with flying colors."

Ali Shutler from NME said the album is "A departure from their scrappy origins, this record is a big, grown-up collection of forward-thinking rock gems. Sure, it might not be as chaotic or feel as grimy as what's come before, but it's a deliberately larger-than-life affair. With Brain Candy, all bets are off: Broader, more colourful and with a lot more to say, it shows Hockey Dad are ready to take on the world."

Track listing

Personnel

Musicians
Hockey Dad
 Zach Stephenson – vocals, guitar
 Billy Fleming – drums

Technical
 John Goodmanson – production

Charts

References

2020 albums
Hockey Dad albums
Albums recorded at Robert Lang Studios